The Mini-Cassette, often written minicassette, is a magnetic tape audio cassette format introduced by Philips in 1967.

It is used primarily in dictation machines and was also employed as a data storage for the Philips P2000 home computer. As of August 2021, Phillips still produces mini-cassette players along with new mini-cassette tapes.

Design
Unlike the Compact Cassette, also designed by Philips, and the later Microcassette, introduced by Olympus, the Mini-Cassette does not use a capstan drive system; instead, the tape is propelled past the tape head by the reels. This is mechanically simple and allows the cassette to be made smaller and easier to use, but produces a system unsuited to any task other than voice recording, as the tape speed is not constant (averaging 2.4 cm/s) and prone to wow and flutter.

However, the lack of a capstan and a pinch roller drive means that the tape is well-suited to being repeatedly shuttled forward and backward short distances as compared to microcassettes, leading to the Mini-Cassette's use in the first generations of telephone answering machines, and continuing use in the niche markets of dictation and transcription, where fidelity is not critical, but robustness of storage is, and where analog media remained in use long after digital media had been introduced.

In 1980, Philips released several recorder models (MDCR220, LDB4401, LDB4051, etc.) that encoded and read digital audio on standard mini-cassettes. A computer model (the Philips P2000) also used the mini-cassette as a digital medium and provided automatic management of the drive, including search, space and directory management, fast-forward and rewind.

Similar products
Philips later introduced a smaller version of the cassette called an Ultra Mini-Cassette that had a max record time of 10 minutes on each side of the tape.

A very similar (but incompatible) cassette format was produced by Hewlett-Packard and Verbatim (the HP82176A Mini Data Cassette) for data storage in their HP82161A tape drive, which, like other minicassettes, did not use a capstan.

References

External links
Phillips Mini-Cassette product page
Philips Speech Processing site
Brief description of the Hewlett Packard 82161A tape drive
Discussion about HP82176A tapes and second-source alternatives

See also
 Microcassette
 Compact Cassette
 Picocassette
 NT (cassette)

Audiovisual introductions in 1967
Audio storage
Tape recording
1967 in music
1967 in technology
Products introduced in 1967